Saint Catharine is an unincorporated community and census-designated place in southeast Linn County, Missouri, United States. Saint Catharine is located approximately four miles east of Brookfield on Missouri Route 11. The Chicago, Burlington and Quincy Railroad passes the south side of the community.

St. Catharine was founded in 1856, and is not named for Catherine of Alexandria, but instead for Mrs. Catherine Elliot, by her husband, William Elliot. A post office called Saint Catherine was established in 1859, and remained in operation until 1993.

Demographics

Notes

Saint Catharine, Missouri
Unincorporated communities in Missouri